Wighton is a village and civil parish in the English county of Norfolk.

The villages name means 'Farm/settlement with a dwelling'.

For the purposes of local government, the parish falls within the district of North Norfolk.

Wighton is on the River Stiffkey and used to have a watermill, but this was demolished in May 1866. The Wells and Walsingham Light Railway runs close to the village, to the west, and there is a halt called Wighton Halt. A regular bus service is provided as the village is on the Coastliner bus route (service number 36) with destinations including Fakenham, Wells, Hunstanton and King's Lynn.

The village was used as the location shooting for "Little Bazeley by the Sea" in the 1965 "The Avengers" episode entitled The Town of No Return with intrepid agents Patrick Macnee (John Steed) and Diana Rigg (Emma Peel.) The local pub featured in the episode was called "The Inebriated Gremlin".

References

External links

.
Information from Genuki Norfolk on Wighton.
NorfolkCoast.co.uk on Wighton.

Villages in Norfolk
Civil parishes in Norfolk
North Norfolk